Prasrabhi (Sanskrit; Tibetan: ཤིན་ཏུ་སྦྱང་བ་, Tibetan Wylie: shin tu sbyang ba, Pali: passaddhi) is a Mahayana Buddhist term translated as "pliancy", "flexibility",  or "alertness". It is defined as the ability to apply body and mind towards virtuous activity.  Prasrabhi is identified as:
 One of the eleven virtuous mental factors within the Mahayana Abhidharma teachings. 
 One of the eight antidotes applied to overcome obstacles in Samatha meditation within the Mahayana tradition.

The Abhidharma-samuccaya states: 

What is alertness? It is the pliability of body and mind in order to interrupt the continuity of the feeling of sluggishness in body and mind. Its function is to do away with all obscurations.

See also 
 Mental factors (Buddhism)
 Passaddhi - the equivalent term in Theravada

Notes

References 
 Guenther, Herbert V. &  Leslie S. Kawamura (1975), Mind in Buddhist Psychology: A Translation of Ye-shes rgyal-mtshan's "The Necklace of Clear Understanding". Dharma Publishing. Kindle Edition.
 Kunsang, Erik Pema (translator) (2004). Gateway to Knowledge, Vol. 1. North Atlantic Books.

External links 
 Ranjung Yeshe wiki entry for shin_tu_sbyang_ba
 Berzin Archives glossary entry for "shin-sbyangs"
 Riga wiki entry for "pliancy"

Wholesome factors in Buddhism
Sanskrit words and phrases